Sir Anthony Keck (1630 – December 1695) was an English lawyer and politician. He was a member of Parliament between 1691 and 1695, and served as Commissioner of the Great Seal from 1689 to 1690.

Early life
Keck was born at Mickleton, Gloucestershire and was baptised on 28 March 1630. He was the fifth son of Nicholas Keck, originally of Long Marston, Warwickshire, and Margaret Morris, daughter of John Morris of Bretforton, Worcestershire. Since he was later described as "a man who raised himself by his wits", it seems likely that his family lacked money or influence.

Career

Keck was called to the bar of the Inner Temple in 1659, and was elected a bencher (a member of the governing body) in 1677. He developed a flourishing chancery practice. During the Popish Plot, he acted as counsel for William Howard, 1st Viscount Stafford, who was executed for treason in 1680, and made something of a name for himself in cases before the House of Lords. He published, anonymously, a series of law reports in 1697.

On 4 March 1689, he was named a Commissioner of the Great Seal with Sir John Maynard and Serjeant Rawlinson by the new King William III – these commissioners replaced the notorious Judge Jeffreys as Lord Chancellor, who fled as James II left the country. Knighted the next day, Keck held office till 14 May 1690: his decision to step down was described as a great act of self-denial.

He also served as MP for Tiverton from 1691. Despite being almost crippled by gout, he played a keen part in its debates, but he developed a very poor opinion of the House of Commons, calling it "a bear garden", poorly attended, and with most of the MPs who did attend being drunk or asleep. He did not stand for election in 1695, probably due to his failing health.

Reputation
Roger North wrote that Keck was by inclination a republican but would settle in default of a republic for a limited monarchy. He described him in character as  "a polite, merry genius", apart from a certain "hardness" caused by his chronic gout.

Personal life

On 11 June 1660, Keck married Mary Thorne, daughter of Francis Thorne. He died a very rich man, although he had to provide for one son and no less than nine daughters, including:

 Francis Keck (d. 1728), who married Jane Dunch.
 Catherine Keck, who married the Hon. Ferdinando Tracy (d. 1682) in 1680. Tracy, a younger son of John Tracy, 3rd Viscount Tracy. After his death in 1682, she married Edward Chute, who inherited the famous country house The Vyne, Hampshire.
 Mary Keck, who married Thomas Vernon of Hanbury Hall, MP for Worcestershire, in 1680.
 Elizabeth Keck (d. 1699), who married Richard Freeman, a barrister who ended his career as Lord Chancellor of Ireland.
 Ann Keck, who married Richard Whitehead.
 Margaret Keck, who married Thomas Barber.
 Maria Keck, who married Edward Cressenor.
 Winifred Keck (d. 1740), who married John Nicholl of Colney Hatch.

Keck died in his house in Bell Yard, Chancery Lane, off the Strand in December 1695. He left property in Drury Lane, Fulham, Hampstead, Gloucestershire and Wiltshire to his only son Francis, with provision to lay out £29,000 on further purchases of lands for him.

Descendants
Through his only son Francis, he was grandfather to Martha Keck (wife of David James), mother of Anthony James (later Keck) (who married Anne Busby of Beaumont), himself the father of Anthony James Keck who was also a politician for Lancashire and Leicestershire. His great-grandson was George Anthony Legh Keck of Bank Hall who was also an MP for Leicestershire.

Through his daughter Catherine, he was a grandfather of John Tracy of Stanway House, who married Anne Atkins (the only daughter of Sir Robert Atkins of Saperton, Chief Baron of the Exchequer). They were parents of Anthony Keck who married Lady Susan Hamilton (a daughter of James Hamilton, 4th Duke of Hamilton) in 1736. Anthony, a protégé of the Duke of Marlborough and an MP for Woodstock, succeeded to his great-uncle Francis Keck's estates at Great Tew in Oxfordshire in 1729, adopting the name of Keck according to a condition of the bequest.

Through his daughter Elizabeth, he was a grandfather of Mary Freeman, who married Walter Edwards and had issue.

Through his daughter Winifred, he was a grandfather of John Nicholl, whose daughter was the great heiress Margaret Nicholl (1736–1768) who married James Brydges, 3rd Duke of Chandos but had no issue. Margaret inherited from her cousin Robert Keck the famous portrait, allegedly of William Shakespeare, which is now called the Chandos portrait.

References

1630 births
1695 deaths
English lawyers
English MPs 1690–1695
Members of the Inner Temple
17th-century English lawyers
People from Mickleton, Gloucestershire